Sai Thant Zin (born 13 August 1965) is a Burmese politician who currently serves as a Pyithu Hluttaw member of parliament for the Hsipaw constituency. He is a member of the Shan Nationalities League for Democracy.

Early life and education 
An ethnic Shan, Thant Zin was born on 13 Aungust 1965 in Taikkyi Township, Myanmar. He graduated with a B.Sc. (Maths) from Yangon University.

Political career
A member of the Shan Nationalities League for Democracy, Thant Zin was elected a Pyithu Hluttaw MP from the Hsipaw constituency.

References

1965 births
Living people
People from Shan State
Shan Nationalities Democratic Party politicians
Burmese people of Shan descent
University of Yangon alumni